Bengassi Airport  is an airport serving Manantali in Mali.

See also
Transport in Mali

References

 OurAirports - Mali
 Google Earth

External links

Airports in Mali